Frederick William, Prince of Nassau-Weilburg (25 October 1768, The Hague – 9 January 1816, Weilburg) was a ruler of Nassau-Weilburg. He was created Prince of Nassau and reigned jointly with his cousin, Prince Frederick Augustus of Nassau-Usingen, who became Duke of Nassau. Frederick William died in January 1816, only two months before his cousin. Both men were succeeded by Frederick William's son, William.

Family
Frederick William was the eldest surviving son of Karl Christian of Nassau-Weilburg and Princess Wilhelmine Carolina of Orange-Nassau.

Wilhelmine Carolina was a daughter of William IV, Prince of Orange and Anne, Princess Royal and Princess of Orange. Anne was in turn the eldest daughter of George II of Great Britain and Caroline of Ansbach.

Marriage and children
On 31 July 1788 in Hachenburg, Frederick William married Burgravine Louise Isabelle of Kirchberg (Hachenburg, 19 April 1772 – Vienna, 6 January 1827). The groom was almost twenty years old and the bride only sixteen. At the time he was still the heir to the principality. His father died on 28 November of the same year and Frederick William succeeded him.

Frederick William and Louise Isabelle had four children:
 William, Duke of Nassau (14 June 1792 – 20 August/30 August 1839).
 Auguste Luise Wilhelmine of Nassau-Weilburg (Weilburg, 5 January 1794 – Weilburg, 11 April 1796).
 Henrietta of Nassau (30 October 1797 – 29 December 1829). Married Archduke Charles, Duke of Teschen
 Friedrich Wilhelm of Nassau-Weilburg, then of Nassau (Bayreuth, 15 December 1799 – Vienna, 6 January 1845). He married on 7 June 1840 Anna Ritter, Edle von Vallyemare (Vienna, 21 June 1802 – Paris, 19 July 1864), created Gräfin von Tiefenbach in 1840, widow of Johann Baptist Brunold. Their only daughter was:
 Wilhelmine Brunold (Altzgersdorf, 5 July 1834 – Geneva, 12 December 1892), created in 1844 Gräfin von Tiefenbach, married in Paris on 30 October 1856 and divorced in 1872 Émile de Girardin (né Émile Delamothe) (Paris, 22 June 1802 – Paris, 27 April 1881).

Ancestry

External links
 

House of Nassau-Weilburg
Nobility from The Hague
1768 births
1816 deaths
Burials in the Royal Crypt of Weilburg Schlosskirche